Philadelphia Lone Star Football Club is an American professional development soccer club based in Southwest Philadelphia, Pennsylvania that competes in USL League Two and the National Premier Soccer League, both leagues which sit in the fourth tier of the American soccer pyramid. Nicknamed "the Stars", the club was founded as Junior Lone Star Football Club in 2001, but changed its name to Philadelphia Lone Star F.C. in 2018.

History
Philadelphia Lone Star F.C. was established in 2001 under the name of Junior Lone Star Football Club by a group of Liberian American immigrant soccer players. The club was named Junior Lone Star FC, after the Liberian national football team, because most of the team's players were from Liberia at that time. 

In 2001, the club had a single team with 11 players but the club has grown over the years with the addition of three teams with over 70 players. In 2012, the First Team will be participating in the National Premier Soccer League; the Reserve Team (U-23) will be participating in the US Club Soccer National Adult League; and the Junior Team (U-19/20) will be participating in the USL Super-20 League.

Junior Lone Star FC won its first major championship in 2008 when the club's U-23 team won the Eastern Pennsylvania State U23 Cup. The club's U23s then represented Eastern Pennsylvania in the 2008 USASA Region I Men's U-23 Cup where they defeated West Chester United SC and FC Delco in the semi-finals and final, respectively. The club's U23s subsequently represented USASA Region I at the 2008 USASA National Men's U-23 Championship where they lost to eventual champions Ela Elite in the semi-finals.

Junior Lone Star FC is affiliated with the United States Youth Soccer Association (USYSA), the United States Adult Soccer Association (USASA) and the US Club Soccer (USCS).

Colors and Badge
Philadelphia Lone Star's home colors are white along with a red and navy stripes on the side. Traditional away colors have been either navy or red; however, in recent years several different colors have been used. Philadelphia Lone Star colors are similar to that of the Liberia national football team . 

The Stars have previously worn two badges on their shirts, prior to their current badge which was implemented on 5 September 2018 after their name change to Philadelphia Lone Star. The Red/White stripes, blue field and white star is a direct reference to the Flag of Liberia while 2001 is in reference to the year the club was founded.

The first, introduced at the club founding in 2001, consisted of a circular badge was based on designs which had been used on official club documentation since the mid-1960s. It consisted of a circular badge which used the same shield as the current badge, inside a circle bearing the name of the club. In late 2011, this was replaced by a circular crest divided into half by the club's name: Junior Lone Star FC. The upper portion of the crest had red and white stripes while the lower portion had a shining white star and the year 2001 within a blue field.

On 5 September 2018, the club rebranded to Philadelphia Lone Star and after members consultation, a new design of the badge was voted for. The shape of the crest is a pointed shield, a symbol of strength and togetherness which has been a staple of the Lone Star ethos and message since our formation in 2001. The 13 vertical stripes of red alternating with white symbolize the 13 original players who formed the first squad of the club in 2001. 

The Liberty Bell is synonymous with the City of Philadelphia, a city that openly welcomed the club members from West Africa. The name of the Bell also resonates with Liberia National Motto : “The Love of LIBERTY Brought Us Here.” There are also two different shades of blue around and within the crest. The left color is taken from the Flag of Philadelphia and the right color is taken from the Flag of Liberia.

Kit suppliers and shirt sponsors

Notable former players

  Anthony Allison
  Derrick Jones

Year-by-year

NPSL

USL League Two

UPSL
As Philadelphia Lone Star II

WPSL

Honors
 U.S. Open Cup
 2017, First Round (Qualified as an amateur side through local qualifying)
 2019, First Round (Qualified as a member of the NPSL through 2018 season results)
 2020 (Qualified as a member of the NPSL through 2019 season results)

 Eastern Pennsylvania Soccer Association
 State Open Cup Champions: 2016, 2018
 State Amateur Cup Champions: 2016, 2018

 Northeast Elite Soccer League
 Regular Season Champions: 2018

 Philadelphia Sierra Soccer League
 Champions: 2011

Source

Stadiums

 Stadium at Monsignor Bonner High School's Turf Stadium; Drexel Hill, Pennsylvania (2013)
 Stadium at Northeast High School's Charles Martin Memorial Stadium; Philadelphia, Pennsylvania (2012)

References

External links
 

Soccer clubs in Philadelphia
Soccer clubs in Pennsylvania
Diaspora soccer clubs in the United States
Amateur soccer teams in Pennsylvania
Association football clubs established in 2001
2001 establishments in Pennsylvania